Alidam is a village in the Kâhta District, Adıyaman Province, Turkey. The village is populated by Kurds of the Mirdêsî tribe and had a population of 847 in 2021.

The hamlet of Gedik is attached to the village.

References

Villages in Kâhta District
Kurdish settlements in Adıyaman Province